Thing or The Thing may refer to:

Philosophy 
 An object
 Broadly, an entity
 Thing-in-itself (or noumenon), the reality that underlies perceptions, a term coined by Immanuel Kant
 Thing theory,  a branch of critical theory that focuses on human–object interactions in literature and culture

History 
 Thing (assembly), also spelled as ting or þing, a historical Germanic governing assembly 
 The Thing (listening device), a Soviet bug used during the Cold War for eavesdropping on the U.S. ambassador to the Soviet Union 
 The Thing (art project), a 1990s community-based in New York City

Film and television 
 The Thing from Another World, often referred to as The Thing, 1951 science fiction film based on the novella Who Goes There?
  The Thing (1982 film), a remake of the 1951 film, directed by John Carpenter, more closely following the original novella Who Goes There?
  The Thing (2011 film), a prequel to the 1982 film
 Thing (The Addams Family), television series character that resembles a hand
 "The Thing", a season 4 episode of SpongeBob SquarePants

Comics 
 Thing (comics), a superhero in the Marvel Universe and member of the Fantastic Four
 The Thing!, a 1950s comic book series from Charlton Comics

Music 
 The Thing (jazz band), a Norwegian/Swedish jazz trio formed in 2000
  The Thing (Jazz Crusaders album), a 1965 album, or the title song
  The Thing (The Thing album), a 2000 album

Songs
 "The Thing" (song), a 1950 song, recorded by Phil Harris and others
 "The Thing", a B-side song on the single release of "Velouria" by Pixies

Video games 
  The Thing (video game), a 2002 gaming sequel to the 1982 film
 Thing, term for entities in the Doom engine

Other uses
 The Thing (roadside attraction), an attraction in the U.S. state of Arizona
 Volkswagen 181, an automobile, known as the "Thing" in the U.S. and sold there 1973–1974

See also
 Our Thing (disambiguation)
 Thang (disambiguation)
 Things (disambiguation)